The Prix Iris for Best Live Action Short Film is an annual film award presented by Québec Cinéma as part of its Prix Iris program, to honour the year's best short film made within the cinema of Quebec.

Until 2016, it was known as the Jutra Award for Best Live Action Short Film in memory of influential Quebec film director Claude Jutra. Following the withdrawal of Jutra's name from the award, the 2016 award was presented under the name Québec Cinéma. The Prix Iris name was announced in October 2016.

1990s

2000s

2010s

2020s

See also
Canadian Screen Award for Best Live Action Short Drama

References

Awards established in 1999
Short film awards
Live Action Short Film
Quebec-related lists
1999 establishments in Canada